The Interfaith Gold Medallion is a prestigious award founded in 1986 and granted by the Sir Sigmund Sternberg Charitable Foundation.

Purpose of the Award

The purpose of the award is to recognize those who have 'endeavored to make an exceptional contribution to the improvement of understanding between the faiths in the United Kingdom, and across the world'. The Medallion is awarded to outstanding individuals who have helped promote peace and tolerance between people of different faiths. This has included Heads of State and Government, Royalty, and religious, civic, business, and philanthropic leaders. 

The Chairman of the award is Michael Sternberg QC KCFO

Previous winners

 Imam Monawar Hussain (2020), Imam of Eton College 
David Dangoor (2019) 
Dr Peter Ammon, German Ambassador to the Court of St James (2017).
The Honourable Mrs Marliese Ammon (2017).
Georg Boomgaarden, German Ambassador to the Court of St James (2013)
Queen Elizabeth II of the United Kingdom (2007) 
Pope John Paul II  (2005) 
Anthony Bailey (2012) 
Ferenc Glatz hungarian academic 
Dr Jacobus (Coos) Schoneveld (1994)
King Hassan II of Morocco
Cardinal Basil Hume
President Árpád Göncz of Hungary
Queen Sofia of Spain
President Dr Johannes Rau of Germany
Archduke Otto von Habsburg of Austria-Hungary
President Mary Robinson of Ireland
King Carl XVI Gustav of Sweden
Cardinal Edward Cassidy
Khaled Al Duwaisan of Kuwait Ambassador to the Court of St James
Lord Khalid Hameed
Lord Yehudi Menuhin
Dr John Templeton
Mr Fuad Nahdi

The Sternberg Charitable Foundation applies its funds for general charitable purposes by the making of grants in particular to charitable institutions. It has a special interest in the furtherance of interfaith activities and the promotion and support of education in the fields of racial and religious harmony.

References 

Interfaith dialogue
International awards